Hold On! by Herman's Hermits is the band's fourth album in the U.S. It was not released in the United Kingdom but an EP was released by EMI/Columbia (catalogue number SEG 8503.) featuring 6 tracks.

It is the soundtrack album to a 1966 film featuring Herman's Hermits and Shelley Fabares, Hold On!

Background
The film's producers had recruited Fred Karger, a Hollywood composer who had served as music director of the group's previous movie, When the Boys Meet the Girls, to write the songs for the movie. In an interview on a television documentary on The British Invasion, Peter Noone recalled that the original title of the film was There's No Place Like Space, for which Karger had written the theme song. However, the group and their manager Mickie Most agreed that the song wasn't right for them and, instead, asked co-star Shelley Fabares' then-husband, record producer Lou Adler, for help. Adler recommended songwriter P.F. Sloan to compose the title track for the film. Sloan's recollection was that the film was to be renamed A Must to Avoid, and he wrote a song for that title, with some contributions from his writing partner Steve Barri. When the studio vetoed that title, the film was then retitled Hold On! after another one of Sloan's songs.

Ultimately, the ten-song US soundtrack album included five songs written by Karger, including the lone song sung by Fabares, four songs written by Sloan/Barri, and one Hermits cover of a 1937 British music hall song. The six-song UK EP used all four Sloan/Barri songs and just two of the Karger songs.

"A Must to Avoid" and a re-recorded version of "Leaning on a Lamp Post" both reached the Billboard Top 10 as singles in the US; a re-recorded "Hold On!" was the B-side of the latter.  "A Must to Avoid" was also a top 10 hit in the UK.

Track listing

US LP version
Side 1
 "Hold On!" (Steve Barri, P.F. Sloan) – 2:06
 "The George and Dragon" (Fred Karger, Sid Wayne, Ben Weisman) – 2:09
 "Got a Feeling" (Karger, Wayne, Weisman) – 2:08
 "Wild Love" (Karger, Wayne, Weisman) – 2:24
 "Leaning on a Lamp Post" (Noel Gay) – 2:34

Side 2
 "Where Were You When I Needed You?" (Barri, Sloan) – 2:48
 "All the Things I Do for You Baby" (Barri, Sloan) – 2:18
 "Gotta Get Away" (Karger, Wayne, Weisman) – 1:55
 "Make Me Happy" (Karger, Wayne, Weisman) (Sung by Shelley Fabares) – 2:14
 "A Must to Avoid" (Barri, Sloan) – 2:18

UK EP version
Side 1
 "Where Were You When I Needed You?"
 "Hold On!"
 "The George and Dragon"

Side 2
 "All the Things I Do for You Baby"
 "Wild Love"
 "A Must to Avoid"

References

Musical film soundtracks
Herman's Hermits albums
Albums produced by Mickie Most
1966 soundtrack albums
MGM Records soundtracks
EMI Records soundtracks
Columbia Records soundtracks
1966 EPs
Columbia Records EPs
EMI Records EPs
MGM Records EPs